John Coventry may refer to:

John Coventry (Royalist) (died 1652), English politician, MP for Evesham
John Coventry (died 1685) (1636–1685), his son, MP for Weymouth and Melcombe Regis
John Bulkeley Coventry (1724–1801), MP for Worcestershire
John Coventry (cricketer) (1903–1969), English cricketer
John Coventry (constructor of philosophical instruments) (1735–1812)

See also
John Coventre (disambiguation)